Andriy Vasilovich Sryubko (born 21 October 1975), is a Ukrainian retired professional ice hockey player. He played for multiple teams during a career that lasted from 1996 until 2013. He also played internationally for the Ukrainian national team at several World Championships, as well as the 2002 Winter Olympics.

Career statistics

Regular season and playoffs

International

External links
 

1975 births
Living people
Amur Khabarovsk players
Fort Wayne Komets players
Grand Rapids Griffins players
Ice hockey players at the 2002 Winter Olympics
HC Kuban players
HC MVD players
Kamloops Blazers players
Langley Thunder players
Las Vegas Thunder players
Molot-Prikamye Perm players
Olympic ice hockey players of Ukraine
Port Huron Border Cats players
ShVSM Kyiv players
Sokil Kyiv players
Sportspeople from Kyiv
Syracuse Crunch players
Toledo Storm players
Ukraine men's national ice hockey team coaches
Ukrainian expatriate sportspeople in Canada
Ukrainian expatriate sportspeople in the United States
Ukrainian ice hockey coaches
Ukrainian ice hockey defencemen
Utah Grizzlies (IHL) players